Percopsidae is a family of fish in the order Percopsiformes, with one extant genus with two species, both endemic to North America, and two known fossil genera.

They are small fish with weak fin spines, and an adipose fin similar to those of trout. They feed on insects and small crustaceans.

References

Trout-perch article by Robert G. Bramblett
Species summary Percopsis transmontana sand roller
Pictures - University of Michigan

Percopsiformes
Fish of North America
Ray-finned fish families